The Irrawaddy Delta or Ayeyarwady Delta lies in the Irrawaddy Division, the lowest expanse of land in Myanmar that fans out from the limit of tidal influence at Myan Aung to the Bay of Bengal and Andaman Sea,  to the south at the mouth of the Ayeyarwady River. On 2 May 2008, the delta suffered a major disaster, devastated by Cyclone Nargis, which reportedly killed at least 77,000 people with over 55,900 missing, and left about 2.5 million homeless.

Geography

Arms and terrain
The Irrawaddy Delta comprises the main arms of Pathein River, Pyapon River, Bogale River, and Toe River. Mawtin Point, formerly Cape Negrais, is a famous landmark in the Irrawaddy Division, and it also marks the south west end of Myanmar. The highest point of the delta, Waphu Mount lies between Pathein and Mawtin Zun (point), on the western strip of the delta. This alluvial plain is bounded to the west by the Rakhine Yoma and to the east by the Bago Yoma. It is dissected into peninsulas and islands by the large southward flowing rivers which are subject to tidal intrusion.

Climate
Most of the rain falls during the monsoons between mid-May and mid-November. It is cool and dry from mid-October to mid-February when temperatures begin to rise with premonsoon squalls in April and early May.

Ecosystems
Water purity lies within the pH range of alkaline condition due to early natural resources and weak environmental control. Mangroves or lamu and nipa palm or dani are the major vegetation of the delta. Moreover, control of weeds is less active as local farmers make mats during the summer. 
Destruction of mangroves and deforestation in the coastal region due to the Cyclone Nargis put it more at risk in future.

River banks

Islands 

The principal islands include Haingyi Kyun, Leit Kyun (Turtle Island), Pyin Salu Kyun, and Meinmahla Kyun (Pretty Women Island).

Major cities 

Major cities include Bogale, Maubin, Myaungmya, Moulmeingyun, Pantanaw, Pathein, Pyapon, Dedaye up to Twante, and Kyauktan.

Canals 
There is no extensive system of irrigation or water transport canals except Twante Canal, constructed during the colonial period. It is much beneficial to the delta region for communication and commerce through water transportation with Yangon. Delta culture hence shifted to Yangon, its influence evident in places and products such as Bogale Market, Mortin Quarter, Yay Kyaw Quarter, Danubyu Restaurants, Pathein Halawa (halva dessert), Tinphyu mats from Pantanaw, and Pathein umbrella.

History 
The delta was historically populated by the Mon. Politically, the Burman kingdoms in farther north of the Irrawaddy River had controlled the delta area since the mid-11th century with few exceptions. The control of the fertile area reverted to Bago-based Mon kingdoms in the 13th to 15th centuries (1287–1539) and briefly in the 18th century (1747–1757).

The delta was also where the British first got a toe-hold in Burma. The British seized Haingyi Kyun or Negrais Island in 1753, after the Mon resisted their request to establish a trading post. The Burmese king Alaungpaya ceded the island to the British in 1757, but retook the island in 1759 by force when the king felt he had been betrayed by the British in his war against the Mon. The battle of Danubyu in 1825 in the delta was the last major stand by the Burmese against the advancing British forces in the First Anglo-Burmese War (1824–1826). The delta was seized by the British in the Second Anglo-Burmese War of 1852 and became part of British Burma.

The British colonial administration drained the marshes and swamps that dominated the area, and built dykes and embankments starting from 1861 for rice cultivation as the Burmans began to migrate south into British Burma in search of greener pastures. Now,  of major embankments in the delta protect 600,000 hectares of paddyland.

Inhabitants
It is mainly populated by farming and fishing communities in several villages besides market towns, mostly located along the main rivers. At 100 per km2, it is one of the most densely populated regions in the country with a total population of 3.5 million. Current inhabitants include, apart from the Mon and Bamar, a majority Pwo Kayin.

Economy and development 
The region is Myanmar's largest rice producer, so its infrastructure of road transportation has been greatly developed during the 1990s and 2000s. Fishing is carried out from fixed fishing frames as well as from small boats. Prawn fishery and harvesting sea turtle eggs are also major commercial activities both of which are now threatened by the loss of mangrove forests as clearing of land proceeds for agriculture. Since communication throughout the delta is easiest by water, almost every household possesses a boat and major towns such as Bogale, Mawlamyinegyun and Myaungmya are served by steamer.

National heritage sites and nature reserves
Meinmahla Kyun Reservation is a national heritage site as well as a natural habitat to many mangrove forests and diverse sea life. The Irrawaddy dolphin (Orcaella brevirostris) is not a true river dolphin native to the Delta region, but it was named after the river, and these sea dolphins are known to enter the rivers of South East Asia.

See also
 Ayeyarwady Division
 Irrawaddy dolphin
 Cyclone Nargis

Notes

References
 National Geographic Magazine
 National Geographic Magazine1
 UNOSAT Myanmar map

External links
Map of Irrawaddy Delta – MSN Encarta
UN:Myanmar's Food Bowl Devastated, May 9 2008

Ayeyarwady Region
River deltas of Asia
Landforms of Myanmar